Yankee Lake has the following meanings:
The village of Yankee Lake, Ohio
Yankee Lake (New York), a lake in Sullivan County, New York